Jessica Charlotte Poland (born January 15, 1988) is an American singer-songwriter, better known by her current and former stage names, JPOLND, Charlotte Sometimes, and Laces. Her debut album Waves and the Both of Us was released on May 6, 2008. She grew up in Wall Township, New Jersey and started playing guitar and writing songs at the age of 14. She has released one full-length album and five EPs. In 2014, Poland retired her stage name and started a new project called LACES.

Biography
Poland was adopted by her parents, Hartson and Tracy Poland, as a baby. She was introduced to her birth mother at age 13.

At age 14, Poland was diagnosed with condylar resorption, a rare disease causing her jaw to essentially break apart. Her condition impaired her ability to sing. By age 16, she had undergone surgery by having two ribs extracted to "rebuild her face." She continues to have injections to treat her jaw.

Raised in Wall Township, New Jersey, Poland attended Wall High School.

Poland got her first stage name from the children's book, Charlotte Sometimes, written in 1969 by Penelope Farmer, about a boarding school student who finds herself transported more than 40 years into the past, into the place of another girl.

Career

2006 – 2008: Career beginnings and Waves and the Both of Us
Poland began her career playing in a five-piece band (J. Poland and The Pilots) in early 2006. The group performed around the New Brunswick, New Jersey area. They soon began playing shows in New York and graduated to larger venues, opening for artists associated with producer/songwriter, Alex Houton. Houton produced much of Poland's early work and co-wrote, produced and contributed guitar work to her major label debut.

In 2008, Poland signed to Geffen Records and released Waves and the Both of Us under the stage name, Charlotte Sometimes. The album peaked at No. 145 on the Billboard 200 and No. 3 on the Billboard Top Heatseekers chart. Poland performed at all venues on the 2008 Warped Tour, and the single "How I Could Just Kill A Man", whose title was inspired by the Cypress Hill song of the same name, was featured on the Warped Tour 2008 Tour Compilation.

2010 – 2014: EPs and The Voice
On May 14, 2010, Poland self-released a free EP entitled "Sideways." Her second EP, The Wait, was released on iTunes August 18, 2011.

In 2012, Poland was a contestant on Season 2 of NBC's The Voice. After having all four judges turn around in the blind audition round, she chose Blake Shelton as her coach. She was eliminated after the first live round. Later that year, Poland finished working on her third EP, Circus Head, which was initially made available to those who had donated to the album's PledgeMusic campaign. The lead single, "Brilliant, Broke and Beautiful," was released on October 3, 2012, with the commercial release of the EP following on October 30, 2012.

In 2013, Poland recorded her fourth (and first acoustic) Charlotte Sometimes EP entitled, "By Request." The lead single, "Magic," premiered on November 18, 2013, and the full album was released on March 4, 2014.

2014 – 2016: LACES and BRZY
In early 2014, Poland announced she had retired her Charlotte Sometimes stage name and would now be writing and recording music under her legal name for a new project, LACES.

The first single under her new moniker, "Love Me Sober," premiered on Billboard on March 5, 2015 and was released to retailers on March 16, 2015. "Love Me Sober" was produced by Dante Jones.

A side project was announced in 2016 titled BRZY, featuring the members of District 76 and LACES. The single "Cause a Little Fire" was released digitally on October 21, 2016.

2016–present: Jessica Vaughn 
In December 2016, "Christmas for the Lonely" was released under the name Jessica Vaughn for the holiday compilation album "SoundRevolver Presents: A Holiday Benefit 2016." In early February 2017, the LACES Facebook account was renamed to "Jessica Vaughn Music."

Discography

Studio albums

Extended plays

Singles

As Charlotte Sometimes

As LACES

References

External links
  for LACES
  for Charlotte Sometimes

1988 births
Living people
People from Wall Township, New Jersey
Wall High School (New Jersey) alumni
Crush Management artists
Geffen Records artists
Sony Music Publishing artists
American adoptees
21st-century American singers
The Voice (franchise) contestants